In mathematical finite group theory, the vertex of a representation of a finite group is a subgroup associated to it, that has a special representation called a source.

References

Representation theory
Finite groups